Eithne FitzGerald (born 28 November 1950) is an Irish economist and former Labour Party politician who served as a Teachta Dála (TD) for the Dublin South constituency from 1992 to 1997. She was a Minister of State in both the 23rd Government of Ireland and the 24th Government of Ireland during her single term as a TD.

She stood unsuccessfully four times for Dáil Éireann at various general elections in the Dublin South constituency, before being elected as TD at the 1992 general election. On that occasion, she topped the poll with the highest first preference vote of any candidate in the country. In January 1993 Labour entered into a coalition government with Fianna Fáil, and FitzGerald was appointed Minister of State at the Department of Finance with special responsibility for the Office of the Tánaiste and the National Development Plan. Labour withdrew from the government in November 1994.

In December 1994, the Rainbow Coalition was formed of Fine Gael, the Labour Party and Democratic Left. FitzGerald was appointed as Minister of State at the Office of the Tánaiste and Minister of State at the Department of Enterprise and Employment. FitzGerald was responsible for the introduction of Freedom of Information legislation in Ireland

She served until the coalition government was defeated at the 1997 general election. FitzGerald lost her seat at that election, being succeeded by Fine Gael's Olivia Mitchell. She stood again in Dublin South at the 2002 general election, but was not elected.

She is married to John D. FitzGerald, the son of Taoiseach Garret FitzGerald.

References

1950 births
Living people
20th-century Irish economists
Irish women economists
Councillors of Dublin County Council
Local councillors in Dún Laoghaire–Rathdown
Labour Party (Ireland) TDs
Members of the 27th Dáil
20th-century women Teachtaí Dála
Ministers of State of the 27th Dáil
Women ministers of state of the Republic of Ireland
21st-century Irish economists